Hans of Antwerp ( – after 1 July 1550) was a goldsmith and merchant working in Tudor London. He supplied silver plate and jewels to the court of Henry VIII.

Career
Hans (or John) of Antwerp, whose real name was Jan van der Goes, was born about 1497. He arrived in London in around 1511 and later "married an English wife, by whom he had many children". He may have been "John Goldsmith, the Ducheman," who was making a piece for the Earl of Shrewsbury in 1516.

In 1528 four of his apprentices were admitted into the Goldsmiths' Company as freemen. He was not yet a freeman of the company, but was censured by the Goldsmiths' Company for not having his work hallmarked. In 1536 he was briefly imprisoned for employing a foreign craftsman without the permission of the company. In 1537 he was made a freeman by the intervention of Thomas Cromwell. He was employed by Cromwell as a goldsmith and court courier, and was used extensively by him from 1537 to 1539. In 1537 "Johan of Andwarpe" sold "goldsmith's works" to Princess Mary.

 
A portrait by Hans Holbein the younger dated 1532 in the Royal Collection, and a portrait miniature in the V&A have been sometime been identified as him. "Holbein had portrayed Van der Gow in 1532, firmly documenting the goldsmith's association with the Steelyard by naming it in the inscription on the letter held in the sitter's hands."

On 7 October, 1543 Hans was one of four men who witnessed Hans Holbein's will. Holbein owed him £6. On 29 November he appeared before John Croke in the Commissary Court to execute his late friend's will.

A gold girdle book cover in the British Museum is attributed to him. The enamelled inscriptions follow (with some errors) the Great Bible of 1539. It depicts in enamel the story of the brazen serpent on one side, and on the other, the Judgement of Solomon. A similar girdle book is depicted in a 1592 portrait of Elizabeth, Philippa, or Joan Speke from Somerset, evidently wearing a treasured heirloom. The girdle book attributed to Hans of Antwerp was updated for use with a book published in 1574.

In 1547 he worked with another goldsmith, Peter Anderson, to supply gilt plate to Henry VIII.

The date of his death is unknown. An entry in the register of the church of St Nicholas Acons, in Lombard Street, of the burial, in 1550, of Hans of Antwerp's 7-year-old son is the last record of his life: "1550, July 1, Augustine Andwarpe, soonne of John Andwarpe"

References

Bibliography

External links

 Prayer-book case, British Museum 1894,0729.1
 Technical description of a locket with the initials of Henry VIII and Katherine of Aragon

Court of Henry VIII
English goldsmiths
Material culture of royal courts
1497 births
1550 deaths